The root alk- is used in organic chemistry to form classification names for classes of organic compounds which contain a carbon skeleton but no aromatic rings. It was extracted from the word alcohol by removing the -ol suffix. See e.g. alkyl, alkane.

Chemistry prefixes
Prefixes